K. V. Chowdary is an officer of the 1978 batch of Indian Revenue Service (IRS). He assumed the charge as Central Vigilance Commissioner on 10 June 2015. He has served as Chairman of the Central Board of Direct Taxes (CBDT).
In 2015, he was appointed as the chairman of Central Vigilance Commission.
He has been appointed as a member of the board directors of Reliance Industries in October 2019.

References

1954 births
Living people
Indian Revenue Service officers
People from Machilipatnam